The Rufisque tramway (French Le Decauville Municipal de Rufisque) was a  long, hand-operated light railway with track gauges of  and  in Rufisque in Senegal.

History 

In order to simplify transport, the first manually operated Decauville Railway was laid in the city around 1880. Initially, individual peanut trading companies, known as escales, installed the rails for various light railways on their own initiative for their own needs, but later the company's own tram systems were consolidated into a municipal system. 

From 1883 there was also a  railway from Rufisque to Dakar. S. 413

Because of the insufficient water depth in the harbour for ocean-going vessels, small boats transported the sacked peanuts from the quay to the ships anchored outside the city. A 1200-ton ship needed four days in Rufisque to pick up a full load, one day more than in the deep-sea port of Dakar.

A toll of two francs had to be paid to transport a ton of peanuts on the Decauville inner-city railway. This toll, which was the main source of income for the city budget, amounted to three francs after the construction of the pier, because economic competition with Dakar no longer played a significant role for Rufisque since then.

From 1902 the economic situation in Rufisque worsened because Dakar,  to the northwest, became the capital of French West Africa, after and due to the construction of a deep sea port and the metre gauge railway, which made it more accessible than before.  The population of Rufisque nevertheless increased during this period from 4500 in 1866 to 8000 in 1891 and 15,000 in 1914. p. 420 

In 1910, 1660 ships docked at Rufisque, importing  and exporting . The most important import was coal.

Old post cards

References 

Rail transport in Senegal
Rufisque
400 mm gauge railways
600 mm gauge railways